Sinphet "Dui" Kruaithong (born 22 August 1995 in Chumphon Buri District, Surin Province) is a Thai Olympic weightlifter. He represented his country at the 2016 Summer Olympics, where he won the bronze medal. With this he became the first Thai male weightlifter to win an olympic medal. His grandmother died while celebrating his victory.

References 

1995 births
Living people
Sinphet Kruaithong
Weightlifters at the 2016 Summer Olympics
Sinphet Kruaithong
Sinphet Kruaithong
Medalists at the 2016 Summer Olympics
Olympic medalists in weightlifting
Weightlifters at the 2018 Asian Games
Sinphet Kruaithong
Sinphet Kruaithong
Sinphet Kruaithong